Navayuga Engineering Company Limited (NEC Limited), the flagship entity of the Navayuga Group, started its operations in 1999 as a private limited company.

Sectors
	Special foundations
	Industrial structures
	Marine structures
	Infrastructure works

Projects
 Krishnapatnam Port
 The Dhola-Sadiya bridge India's longest bridge which spans across the Lohit River to connect the states of Assam and Arunachal Pradesh. The bridge is 3.55 kilometres (2.21 mi) longer than the Bandra-Worli Sea Link over the Mahim Bay in Mumbai.
 Marine structures in the ports of Visakhapatnam, Pipavav, Haldia, Tuticorin, Kandla, Jawaharlal Nehru Port (JNPT), Mangalore and Kakinada.
 Sripada Sagar Project – Stage II, Phase - I 
 Construction of Sri Komaram Bhim Project (Pedda vagu project) 
 Pranahitha - Chevella Lift Irrigation Scheme ( Link II - Package No - 6 & Link VII - Package No - 21)
 Construction of Chagallu Barrage 
 Bheema lift irrigation project
 MAHATMA GANDHI (Kalwakurthy) Lift Irrigation Scheme 
 Koderma Thermal Power Station, Jharkhand
 Dibang River Bridge - It will be the second longest bridge in India after its completion. It spans over 6.20 km on Dibang River connecting Roing to Pasighat via Dambuk in Arunachal Pradesh

Incidents
In 2002 two spans of the bridge under construction across the Munneru River at Keesara near Vijayawada collapsed killed two persons and injured 24.

References

Engineering companies of India
Companies based in Visakhapatnam
Construction and civil engineering companies established in 1986
Indian brands
Indian companies established in 1986
Navayuga Group
1986 establishments in Andhra Pradesh